Kazimierz Krzemiński (born 25 February 1902, date of death unknown) was a Polish cyclist. He competed in two events at the 1924 Summer Olympics.

References

External links
 

1902 births
Year of death missing
Polish male cyclists
Olympic cyclists of Poland
Cyclists at the 1924 Summer Olympics
Sportspeople from Lviv
Polish Austro-Hungarians
People from the Kingdom of Galicia and Lodomeria